The Four Gospels may refer to:

 Canonical gospels, the four Christian gospels included in the New Testament
 Four Gospels of Ivan Alexander, a 14th-century illuminated manuscript prepared and illustrated during the rule of Tsar Ivan Alexander
 Vani Four Gospels, a 12th to 14th-century illuminated manuscript of the gospels in the Georgian Nuskhuri script
 The Four Gospels (Gundulić), the first book printed in Belgrade, by Trojan Gundulić in 1552
 Четвероевангеліе (The Four Gospels), a manuscript of the canonical Gospels printed by Pyotr Mstislavets in 1574–1575
 The Four Gospels: A Study of Origins, a 1924  book of biblical scholarship by Burnett Hillman Streeter

See also
Gospel harmony, attempts to compile the canonical gospels into a single account
Four Evangelists, the authors of the canonical gospels

Canonical Gospels